Erik Nielsen (born 12 December 1937 in Copenhagen, Denmark) is a former Danish international football player, and father of the former international football player, now manager, Kent Nielsen.

Erik Nielsen had his whole career in the football club Brønshøj Boldklub, for which he had 328 appearances (from 1956–69). This was a club record set at a time when the Danish league was under a strict code of amateurism.

He was capped once, in a match against East Germany in Leipzig in 1962. Additionally he had 3 appearances on the so called "National team - B", and in his younger years 5 appearances on various youth national teams. 
  
Erik Nielsen is also the father of Tommy Nielsen who had 283 appearances for Brønshøj Boldklub.

References 

1937 births
Living people
Brønshøj Boldklub players
Danish men's footballers
Denmark international footballers
Denmark under-21 international footballers
Association footballers not categorized by position